In Another World with My Smartphone is a Japanese light novel series written by Patora Fuyuhara and illustrated by Eiji Usatsuka. It began as a web novel on Shōsetsuka ni Narō website since April 8, 2013. The series was later published by Hobby Japan beginning on May 22, 2015; twenty-seven volumes have been published as of October 19, 2022. J-Novel Club licensed the novel for a digital release. At Anime Expo on July 5, 2018, J-Novel Club announced that the series would be published in print with Ingram Publisher Services. The novel series was adapted into a manga series by Soto began serialization in the January 2017 issue of Comp Ace (published November 2016), with the first two compiled tankōbon volumes released consecutively in June and July 2017 and the third volume in February 2018.


Light novel

Manga

References

External links 
 

In Another World with My Smartphone
In Another World with My Smartphone